Welf II ( - died 10 March 1030) was a Swabian count and a member of the Elder House of Welf.

Life
He was a younger son of Count Rudolf II and Ita, a daughter of Duke Conrad I of Swabia of the Conradine dynasty. He constructed a castle at Ravensburg.

In the 1020s, Welf feuded with the Augsburg and Freising bishops. He pillaged the treasury of Bishop Bruno of Augsburg, brother of Emperor Henry II, and sacked the city of Augsburg.

Welf opposed the election of the Salian count Conrad II as King of the Romans in 1024 because it did not suit his interests, but he had to eventually relent. The next year he joined a rebellion launched by the Babenberg duke Ernest II of Swabia, but finally submitted in 1027. He died, probably in captivity, in 1030. He was buried at Weingarten Abbey.

Marriage and issue
Welf II was married to Imiza, daughter of Count Frederick of Luxembourg. With Imiza, Welf had at least two children:
Welf, Duke of Carinthia (Welf III; d. 1055)
Kunigunde of Altdorf (also called Chuniza; c. 1020 – 31 August 1054)

Sources

F-R. Erkens, Konrad II. Herrschaft und Reich des ersten Salierkaisers (Regensburg 1998).
Reuter, Timothy. Germany in the Early Middle Ages 800–1056. New York: Longman, 1991.
B. Schneidmüller: Die Welfen. Herrschaft und Erinnerung (819–1252). (Stuttgart, 2000), pp. 119–123.
A. Thiele, Erzählende genealogische Stammtafeln zur europäischen Geschichte Band I, Teilband 1 (Frankfurt/Main 1993). 
T. Zotz, 'Welf II.,' in: Lexikon des Mittelalters (LexMA), Volume 8 (Munich, 1997), cols. 2143–2144.

External links
Welf II, Graf von Altdorf (in German)

Notes

1030 deaths
Elder House of Welf
Year of birth unknown
Year of birth uncertain
Burials at Schönau Abbey
11th-century German nobility
Counts of Germany
Swabian nobility